Lunia may refer to:

 Lunia: Record of Lunia War, a 2008 video game
 Lunia (Dungeons & Dragons), the first layer of Mount Celestia in Dungeons & Dragons